Olga Alexandrova (born 28 January 1978) is a Ukrainian-born Spanish chess player who holds the FIDE titles of International Master and Woman Grandmaster.

She is married to Spanish Grandmaster Miguel Illescas. This resulted in an awkward situation in the final round of the 2011 Spanish championship, when the couple found themselves paired against each other with the national title at stake. They agreed a quick draw, allowing Alvar Alonso Rosell to catch Illescas and claim the title on tie-break.

She has won the women's Ukrainian Chess Championship in 2004, and the women's Spanish Chess Championship in 2013.

She has competed twice in the Women's World Chess Championship.

References

External links 
 
 
 

1978 births
Living people
Ukrainian female chess players
Spanish female chess players
Chess International Masters
Chess woman grandmasters
Place of birth missing (living people)